Frank John "Skeeter" Scalzi (June 16, 1913 – August 25, 1984) was an American professional baseball player and manager. A 5-foot, 6 inch (1.68 m), 160-pound (72.6 kg) shortstop and third baseman, Scalzi threw and batted right-handed.

Born in Lafferty, Ohio, Scalzi attended the University of Alabama where his roommate was the future longtime Alabama Crimson Tide head football coach Paul "Bear" Bryant. His 17-year baseball playing career, which began in 1936, was almost exclusively spent in the minor leagues. The exception was an 11-game, 18-at bat trial with the 1939 New York Giants of Major League Baseball. Scalzi collected six hits, all singles, for a batting average of .333, with one stolen base. He started four games at shortstop during his stint with the Giants.

Scalzi became a minor-league manager in 1947, and worked in that role for 12 years in several organizations, most notably the Chicago White Sox farm system, through 1960.

Skeeter Scalzi died in Pittsburgh, Pennsylvania at the age of 71. He was interred at Upland Cemetery, Yorkville, Ohio.

External links
 Career playing and managing record, from Baseball Reference
 

1913 births
1984 deaths
Alabama Crimson Tide baseball players
American people of Italian descent
Baseball players from Ohio
Charleston ChaSox players
Colorado Springs Sky Sox managers
Davenport DavSox players
Elmira Pioneers players
Fayetteville Cubs players
Hopkinsville Hoppers players
Knoxville Smokies players
Lynchburg Cardinals players
Major League Baseball shortstops
New Orleans Pelicans (baseball) players
New York Giants (NL) players
Norfolk Tars players
People from Belmont County, Ohio
Sacramento Solons players
Springfield Indians (baseball) players
Sunbury Giants players
Vicksburg Hill Billies players
Zanesville Greys players
Holdrege White Sox players
American expatriate sportspeople in Colombia